</noinclude>

Stage Door Canteen is a 1943 American World War II  film with musical numbers and other entertainment interspersed with dramatic scenes by a largely unknown cast. The film was produced by Sol Lesser's Principal Artists Productions and directed by Frank Borzage. The film features many celebrity cameo appearances but primarily relates a simple drama set in the famed New York City restaurant and nightclub for American and Allied servicemen. Six bands are featured. The score and the original song, "We Mustn't Say Goodbye", were nominated for Academy Awards.

Stage Door Canteen is in the public domain in North America and for this reason is widely available in many DVD and VHS releases of varying quality.

Plot

The film, made in wartime, celebrates the work of the Stage Door Canteen, created in New York City as a recreational center for both American and Allied servicemen on leave to socialize with, be entertained or served by Broadway celebrities. The storyline follows several women who volunteer for the Canteen and must adhere to strict rules of conduct, the most important of which is that their job is to provide friendly companionship to and be dance partners for the (often nervous) men who are soon to be sent into combat. No romantic fraternization is allowed. Eileen is a volunteer who confesses to only becoming involved in the Canteen in order to be discovered by one of the Hollywood stars in attendance. She ultimately finds herself falling in love with one of the soldiers.

Production
Stage Door Canteen was made under the auspices of the American Theatre Wing. The actual Stage Door Canteen in New York City was a basement club located in the 44th Street Theatre, and it could not be used for the filming as it was too busy receiving servicemen. The settings were recreated at the Fox Movietone Studio in New York and at RKO Pathé Studios in Los Angeles. Stage Door Canteen was in production from November 30, 1942, to late January 1943.

Star appearances range from momentary cameos, such as Johnny Weissmuller working in the Canteen's kitchen, to more substantial roles. In a June 1943 feature story titled "Show Business at War", Life magazine counted a total of 82 performers in Stage Door Canteen, and provided total screen time for some of them:
Ray Bolger, dancing (391 seconds)
Edgar Bergen with Charlie McCarthy (248 seconds) and Mortimer Snerd (102 seconds)
Gypsy Rose Lee, performing a "strip" on stage (331 seconds)
Gracie Fields, singing the "Machine Gun Song" and "The Lord's Prayer" (197 seconds)
Katharine Cornell, serving food with Aline MacMahon and Dorothy Fields and reciting from Romeo and Juliet with Lon McCallister (113 seconds)
Ed Wynn, various scenes (101 seconds)
Katharine Hepburn, appears at the close with Selena Royle and in a scene with Cheryl Walker which was written by Robert Sherwood (99 seconds)
Ethel Merman, singing "Marching Through Berlin" (95 seconds)
Alfred Lunt and Lynn Fontanne working in the kitchen (81 seconds)
Tallulah Bankhead, working as a senior hostess (50 seconds)
Ina Claire, mediating a dispute between sailors who want to dance with her (43 seconds)
Helen Hayes, working as a senior hostess (43 seconds)

Stage Door Canteen represents the only film appearance of Katharine Cornell. It features a performance of "Why Don't You Do Right?" by Benny Goodman and His Orchestra, which became the first major hit for singer Peggy Lee.

African-American producer Leonard Harper was hired to do the African-American casting in New York City.  Of additional cultural note are two segments, one in which Merle Oberon sings the praises of America's Chinese allies, represented by Chinese airmen, and another in which Sam Jaffe interviews several Soviet officers, one of them female, in both English and Russian.

Cast

Story cast

 Cheryl Walker as Eileen
 William Terry as Dakota
 Marjorie Riordan as Jean
 Lon McCallister as California
 Margaret Early as Ella Sue
 Michael Harrison as Tex
 Dorothea Kent as Mamie
 Fred Brady as Jersey
 Patrick O'Moore as The Australian
 Marian Shockley as Lillian

Featured bands

Count Basie with Ethel Waters
Xavier Cugat with Lina Romay
Benny Goodman with Peggy Lee
Kay Kyser
Guy Lombardo
Freddy Martin

Featured cast
These featured cast members either perform or have extended dialogue in the story.

Kenny Baker
Edgar Bergen 
Ray Bolger
Katharine Cornell
Gracie Fields
Helen Hayes
Katharine Hepburn
Sam Jaffe
George Jessel
Gypsy Rose Lee
Yehudi Menuhin
Ethel Merman
Selena Royle
Lanny Ross
Ethel Waters
Ed Wynn

Cameo appearances
These featured players make brief appearances in the film.

Judith Anderson
Tallulah Bankhead
Ralph Bellamy
Ina Claire
Lynn Fontanne
Hugh Herbert
Jean Hersholt
Alfred Lunt
Harpo Marx
Elsa Maxwell
Paul Muni
Merle Oberon
George Raft
Martha Scott
Johnny Weissmuller
Vera Gordon

Other stage, screen and radio artists making cameo appearances include the following:

Henry Armetta
Helen Broderick
Lloyd Corrigan
Jane Darwell
William Demarest
Virginia Field
Arlene Francis
Vinton Freedley
Ann Gillis
Lucile Gleason
Virginia Grey
Allen Jenkins
Roscoe Karns
Tom Kennedy
Otto Kruger
June Lang
Betty Lawford
Bert Lytell
Aline MacMahon
Horace McMahon
Helen Menken
Peggy Moran
Alan Mowbray
Elliott Nugent
Franklin Pangborn
Helen Parrish
Brock Pemberton
Cornelia Otis Skinner
Ned Sparks
Bill Stern
Arleen Whelan
Dame May Whitty

Music

 "Flight of the Bumblebee"
 "A Rookie and His Rhythm"
 "She's a Bombshell from Brooklyn"
 "We Mustn't Say Goodbye"
 "Sleep Baby Sleep (in Your Jeep)"
 "Don't Worry Island"
 "You're Pretty Terrific Yourself"
 "Quicksand"
 "The Girl I Love to Leave Behind"
 "The Machine Gun Song"
 "The Lord's Prayer"
 "Good Night, Sweetheart"
 "Marching Through Berlin"
 "Rhumba-Rhumba"
 "Why Don't You Do Right?"
 "Bugle Call Rag" play by Benny Goodman band
 Schubert's "Ave Maria", played by violinist Yehudi Menuhin
 "Marines' Hymn"

Release
Distributed by United Artists, Stage Door Canteen was released June 24, 1943, with a run time of 132 minutes. Some modern prints have been trimmed to 93 minutes.

Accolades
Stage Door Canteen was named one of the ten best motion pictures of 1943 in a Film Daily poll of 439 newspaper and radio reviewers.

The film received two Academy Award nominations—for the original score by Fred Rich, and for the original song, "We Mustn't Say Goodbye", by James V. Monaco (music) and Al Dubin (lyrics).

Reception
Bosley Crowther, film critic for The New York Times, prefaced his remarks on the film by stating his aversion to the contemporary trend toward all-star spectacles, which he called "cheap showmanship": But for once, we've got to make a frank concession. As done in Stage Door Canteen this parading of show-world notables has some real dramatic point. It shapes a glamorous, atmospheric setting within which a slight story is played—a setting as real as is the Canteen for a story that is old as the hills. … And, besides, some of the acts are pretty good.

Crowther praised producer Sol Lesser for creating an illusion of authenticity by casting newcomers to the screen—"anybody's boys and girls … just so many nice kids at the Canteen." He credited the film for catching the generous spirit of show people wishing to do their part to help win the war. "As a general rule," he concluded, "this writer is depressed by a bandwagon of stars. But this is one time when the spectacle really brings a lump of pride to the throat."

All proceeds, after Lesser's 8.5 percent, were donated to the American Theatre Wing and its allied charities. The film was such a success at the boxoffice that Lesser was able to turn over $1.5 million—the equivalent of more than $20.5 million today.

"Patriotism, entertainment, and romance mix badly", wrote modern critic Pauline Kael, who looked back on the film for The New Yorker. "Many famous performers make fools of themselves … Katharine Cornell, Katharine Hepburn, and Paul Muni fare a shade worse than most of the other 50-odd famous performers; Ray Bolger and Ed Wynn come off rather better." Kael termed the film "depressing" and particularly criticized Delmer Daves's "horribly elaborate narrative". Dave Kehr of The New York Times called the film "an interesting document on World War II".

See also
 44th Street Theatre
 Hollywood Canteen
 Thank Your Lucky Stars
 Cowboy Canteen
 Show Business at War

References

External links

 Stage Door Canteen Full Movie
 
 
 
 
 
 
 

1943 films
1943 musical films
American musical films
American black-and-white films
Films directed by Frank Borzage
Films produced by Frank Borzage
Films scored by Freddie Rich
Films set in New York City
Films set on the home front during World War II
United Artists films
Films produced by Sol Lesser
American World War II propaganda films
1940s English-language films